Manjara Dam, is an earthfill dam on the Manjara River near keij Beed and Kalamb Osmanabad  in state of Maharashtra in India. Till September 2016, the reservoir completely dried up, after four years of no rainfall. At end of September 2016 the reservoir full.

Specifications

Purpose
 Irrigation

Ecology
Although there is increased alkalinity during the summer season when dissolved oxygen was less, the water is suitable for irrigation.

See also
 Dams in Maharashtra
 List of reservoirs and dams in India

References

Dams in Osmanabad district
Dams completed in 1982
1982 establishments in Maharashtra